The Palace of Sintra, also called Town Palace (Palácio da Vila), is located in the town of Sintra, in the Lisbon District of Portugal.  It is a present-day historic house museum.

It is the best-preserved medieval royal residence in Portugal, being inhabited more or less continuously from at least the early 15th century to the late 19th century. It is a significant tourist attraction, and is part of the cultural landscape of Sintra, a designated UNESCO World Heritage Site.

History

Middle ages

It was one of two castles at what is now Sintra in the Moorish Al-Andalus era that began with the Umayyad conquest of Hispania in the 8th century. The other, now known as the Castelo dos Mouros (Castle of the Moors), located atop a high hill overlooking modern Sintra, is now a romantic ruin.

The castle now known as Sintra National Palace, located downhill from the Castelo dos Mouros, was the residence of the Islamic Moorish Taifa of Lisbon rulers of the region. The earliest mention in a source is by Arab geographer Al-Bacr. In the 12th century the village was conquered by King Afonso Henriques, who took the 'Sintra Palace' castle for his use. The blend of Gothic, Manueline, Moorish, and Mudéjar styles in the present palace is, however, mainly the result of building campaigns in the 15th and early 16th centuries.

Chapel

Nothing built during Moorish rule or during the reign of the first Portuguese kings survives. The earliest surviving part of the palace is the Royal Chapel, possibly built during the reign of King Dinis I in the early 14th century. The palace chapel has a tiled floor with tiles in the apse laid to resemble a carpet.  The walls are painted in patterned squares that look like tiles and depict the Holy Ghost descending in the form of a dove.  The wooden ceiling is decorated in geometrically patterned Moorish latticework.

Early palace
Much of the palace dates from the times of King John I, who sponsored a major building campaign starting around 1415.

Most buildings around the central courtyard - called the Ala Joanina (John's Wing) - date from this campaign, including the main building of the façade with the entrance arches and the mullioned windows in Manueline and Moorish styles called biforas, the conical chimneys of the kitchen that dominate the skyline of the city, and many rooms including:
The  Swan Room (Sala dos Cisnes) in Manueline style, named so because of the swans painted on the ceiling. The number of painted swans, the symbol of the house of the groom, Philip the Good of Burgundy, equals to the bride's, Infanta Isabel, age – 30.
Magpie Room (Sala das Pegas); the magpies (pegas) painted on the ceiling and the frieze hold the emblem por bem (for honour) in their beaks. This relates to the story that the king John I was caught in the act of kissing a lady-in-waiting by his queen Philippa of Lancaster. To put a stop to all the gossip, he had the room decorated with as many magpies as there were women at the court (136).
Patios: the early wing of the palace features courtyards embellished with tiles and featuring Islamic style water pools.

John I's son, King Duarte I, was very fond of the Palace and stayed long periods here. He left a written description of the Palace that is very valuable in understanding the development and use of the building, and confirms that much of the palace built by his father has not changed much since its construction. Another sign of the preference for this Palace is that Duarte's successor King Afonso V was born (1432) and died (1481) in the Palace. Afonso V's successor, King John II, was acclaimed King of Portugal here.

Medieval palace
Bedroom-Prison of King Afonso VI.  This room in the medieval section of the Palace, with its original tiled floor, was the prison of Alfonso VI until his death in 1683.

16th century
Arab Room (Sala dos Árabes) is a tiled room with a Moorish style fountain in the center. 
Kitchens.  The pair of extraordinary kitchens are large rooms each with a wall of ovens and cooking stoves above which, in place of a ceiling, rise an enormous pair of conical chimneys that taper as they reach skyward.
The Coat of Arms Room,  in Manueline style, the most magnificently decorated room in the palace, features the heraldic symbols of the Portuguese noble families, and is one of the most artistically significant heraldic room in Europe.

The other major building campaign that defined the structure and decoration of the palace was sponsored by King Manuel I between 1497 and 1530, using the wealth engendered by the exploratory expeditions in this Age of Discoveries. The reign of this King saw the development of a transitional Gothic-Renaissance art style, named Manueline, as well as a kind of revival of Islamic artistic influence (Mudéjar) reflected in the choice of polychromed ceramic tiles (azulejos) as a preferred decorative art form.

King Manuel ordered the construction of the so-called Ala Manuelina (Manuel's Wing), to the right of the main façade, decorated with typical manueline windows. He also built the Coats-of-Arms Room (Sala dos Brasões) (1515–1518), with a magnificent wooden coffered domed ceiling decorated with 72 coats-of-arms of the King and the main Portuguese noble families. The coat-of-arms of the Távora family was however removed after their conspiracy against king Joseph I. According to one source, "this new confidant style encompassed Gothic, Renaissance and Mudéjar influences which was later named after the King – Manueline".

King Manuel also redecorated most rooms with polychromed tiles specially made for him in Seville. These multicoloured azulejo tile panels bear Mudéjar motifs.

Modern times

In the following centuries the palace continued to be inhabited by Kings from time to time, gaining new decoration in the form of paintings, tile panels and furniture. A sad story associated with the palace is that of the mentally unstable King Afonso VI, who was deposed by his brother Pedro II and forced to live without leaving the residence from 1676 until his death in 1683.

The ensemble suffered damage after the 1755 Lisbon earthquake but was restored in the "old fashion", according to contemporary accounts. The biggest loss to the great earthquake was the tower over the Arab Room, which collapsed. At the end of the 18th century, Queen Maria I redecorated and redivided the rooms of the Ala Manuelina.

During the 19th century, Sintra became again a favourite spot for the Kings and the Palace of Sintra was frequently inhabited. Queen Amélia, in particular, was very fond of the palace and made several drawings of it. With the foundation of the Republic, in 1910, it became a national monument. In the 1940s, it was restored by architect Raul Lino, who tried to return it to its former splendour by adding old furniture from other palaces and restoring the tile panels. It has been an important historical tourist attraction ever since.

See also
Palaces in Portugal
Azulejo

Notes

References
José Custodio Vieira da Silva. O Palácio Nacional de Sintra. IPPAR-Scala Publishers, 2002 (in Portuguese).
Turner, J.  Grove Dictionary of Art. Macmillan Publishers Ltd., 1996; 
The Rough Guide to Portugal, 11th ed. March 2005; 
Art & History : Lisbon. Casa Editrice Bonechi. 2000, p. 110.

External links
 
 National Palace of Sintra Official website

Palaces in Portugal
Royal residences in Portugal
Buildings and structures in Sintra
Palaces in Lisbon District
Museums in Lisbon District
Historic house museums in Portugal
Houses completed in 1530
Gothic architecture in Portugal
Manueline architecture
Moorish architecture in Portugal
Mudéjar architecture
Azulejos in buildings in Portugal
National monuments in Lisbon District